Flour bleaching agent is the agent added to fresh milled grains to whiten the flour by removing the yellow colour pigment called xanthophyll. It whitens the flour, which is used in the baking industry.

Overview
Usual flour bleaching agents are:
Organic peroxides (benzoyl peroxide)
Calcium peroxide
Chlorine
Chlorine dioxide
Azodicarbonamide
Nitrogen dioxide
Atmospheric oxygen, used during natural aging of flour

Use of chlorine, bromates, and peroxides is not allowed in the European Union.

Bleached flour improves the structure-forming capacity, allowing the use of dough formulas with lower proportions of flour and higher proportions of sugar . In biscuit making, use of chlorinated flour reduces the spread of the dough, and provides a "tighter" surface. The changes of functional properties of the flour proteins are likely to be caused by their oxidation.

In countries where bleached flour is prohibited, microwaving plain flour produces similar chemical changes to the bleaching process. This improves the final texture of baked goods made to recipes intended for bleached flours.

See also

Chorleywood bread process – another bread making process that increases volume
Flour treatment agent
Graham flour – an early unbleached whole-grain flour
Maida flour – a commonly bleached flour in India

References

Food additives